Alexander's or Alexanders may refer to:

 Alexanders, a flowering plant
 Alexander's, a former department store company
 Alexanders (Boise, Idaho), a men's clothing store
"Alexander's Ragtime Band", a 1911 song by Irving Berlin
 Alexander's Ragtime Band (film), a 1938 film based around the song
 Brantford Alexanders, a hockey team